Gulf International Bank (GIB) was established in 1976 during the first oil boom and is incorporated in the Kingdom of Bahrain as a conventional wholesale bank. It is licensed by the Central Bank of Bahrain and is headquartered in Manama in Bahrain.

Gulf International Bank, through its subsidiaries, provides its services in the Gulf Cooperation Council countries and internationally. The company offers structured financing and advisory services for corporate and institutional customers in various sectors, including oil and gas, LNG, petrochemicals, power and water, infrastructure, telecom and technology-based projects, and aircraft and ships; and underwrites and arranges limited-recourse term financing with a range of debt finance products, such as syndicated debt finance, Islamic finance, export credit, and capital markets. It also provides a range of financial advisory services. In addition, the company offers asset and fund management services to the Middle East semi-governmental institutions and European financial institutions.

Our funding profile continues to strengthen, with
growing access to stable and less costly funding
through meem digital banking, and the global
transaction banking business. Customer deposits
increased 16 per cent to US$21.2 billion, constituting
96 per cent of total deposits, and exceeding loans and
advances by more than 2 times. At the end of 2019,
the Group’s Net Stable Funding Ratio (NSFR) stood at a
particularly high 163 per cent compared to the Central
Bank of Bahrain’s mandated regulatory minimum of
100 per cent. This strong ratio reflected the high level
of stable funding maintained by each entity within the
GIB Group. Stable funding was enhanced by senior
term finance of US$3.5 billion at the 2019 year end.

Operations, subsidiaries and shareholders
Gulf International Bank B.S.C. (GIB) is a pan GCC universal bank established in
1975 and regulated by the Central Bank of Bahrain.
GIB offers a diverse range of financial products and services and bespoke banking
solutions to a wide customer base in the GCC, Europe and North America. This
includes corporate banking, the world’s first Shariah compliant digital retail banking
service, meem, as well as investment banking spanning asset management, bond
and sukuk issuance, financial restructuring, private placements, private sale, IPOs,
underwriting equity and debt, and mergers and acquisitions.
GIB’s services are delivered across the GCC and international markets through its
subsidiaries: GIB Saudi Arabia, GIB Capital and GIB (UK) Ltd. Additionally, the Bank
has branches in the UAE and USA.
GIB Saudi Arabia is the first foreign domiciled bank to establish a local commercial
bank in the Kingdom. It is headquartered in Eastern Province and operates
branches in Riyadh, Jeddah and Dhahran, while the Bank’s investment banking
activities are delivered by GIB Capital, based in Riyadh.
GIB (UK) Ltd is a London and New York based international asset management
subsidiary.
GIB is owned by the governments of the Gulf Cooperation Council countries, with
Saudi Arabia’s Public Investment Fund being the primary shareholder.

GIB’s main subsidiary is its UK branch, Gulf International Bank (UK) Ltd, which is based in Knightsbridge, London. The Saudi International Bank merged into this UK branch in 2000. The bank also has branches in London, New York, Abu Dhabi, Dhahran, Riyadh and Jeddah with a representative office in Dubai.

In 2017 GIB licensed to become a local bank in Saudi Arabia.

Board of Directors
 Dr. Abdullah bin Hassan Alabdulgader – Chairman of the board
 Mr. Abdulla bin Mohammed Al Zamil – Vice Chairman 
 Mr. Abdulaziz bin Abdulrahman Al-Helaissi – Director, Group Chief Executive Officer,
Gulf International Bank
Chairman, Gulf International Bank (UK) Limited 
 Mr. Sultan bin Abdul Malek Al-Sheikh – Director 
 Mr. Bander bin Abdulrahman bin Mogren — Director 
 Dr. Najem bin Abdulla Al Zaid — Director 
 Mr. Rajeev Kakar — Director 
 Mr. Frank Schwab — Director

References

1975 establishments in Bahrain
Banks established in 1975
Banks of Bahrain
Banks of Saudi Arabia